The World Bank Group (WBG) is a family of five international organizations that make leveraged loans to developing countries. It is the largest and best-known development bank in the world and an observer at the United Nations Development Group. The bank is headquartered in Washington, D.C. in the United States. It provided around $98.83 billion in loans and assistance to "developing" and transition countries in the 2021 fiscal year. The bank's stated mission is to achieve the twin goals of ending extreme poverty and building shared prosperity. Total lending as of 2015 for the last 10 years through Development Policy Financing was approximately $117 billion. Its five organizations are the International Bank for Reconstruction and Development (IBRD), the International Development Association (IDA), the International Finance Corporation (IFC), the Multilateral Investment Guarantee Agency (MIGA) and the International Centre for Settlement of Investment Disputes (ICSID). The first two are sometimes collectively referred to as the World Bank.

The World Bank's (the IBRD's and IDA's) activities focus on developing countries, in fields such as human development (e.g. education, health), agriculture and rural development (e.g. irrigation and rural services), environmental protection (e.g. pollution reduction, establishing and enforcing regulations), infrastructure (e.g. roads, urban regeneration, and electricity), large industrial construction projects, and governance (e.g. anti-corruption, legal institutions development). The IBRD and IDA provide loans at preferential rates to member countries, as well as grants to the poorest countries. Loans or grants for specific projects are often linked to wider policy changes in the sector or the country's economy as a whole. For example, a loan to improve coastal environmental management may be linked to the development of new environmental institutions at national and local levels and the implementation of new regulations to limit pollution.

History

Founding
The WBG came into formal existence on 27 December 1946 following international ratification of the Bretton Woods agreements, which emerged from the United Nations Monetary and Financial Conference (1–22 July 1944). It also provided the foundation of the Osiander Committee in 1951, responsible for the preparation and evaluation of the World Development Report. Commencing operations on 25 June 1946, it approved its first loan on 9 May 1947 (USD 250M to France for postwar reconstruction, in real terms the largest loan the Bank has issued to date).

Membership

All of the 188 UN members and Kosovo that are WBG members participate at a minimum in the IBRD. As of May 2016, all of them also participate in some of the other four organizations (IDA, IFC, MIGA, and ICSID).

WBG members by the number of organizations in which they participate:
Only in the IBRD: None
The IBRD and one other organization: San Marino, Nauru, Tuvalu, Brunei
The IBRD and two other organizations: Antigua and Barbuda, Suriname, Venezuela, Namibia, Marshall Islands, Kiribati
The IBRD and three other organizations: India, Mexico, Belize, Jamaica, Dominican Republic, Brazil, Bolivia, Uruguay, Ecuador, Dominica, Saint Vincent and the Grenadines, Guinea-Bissau, Equatorial Guinea, Angola, South Africa, Seychelles, Libya, Somalia, Ethiopia, Eritrea, Djibouti, Bahrain, Qatar, Iran, Malta, Bulgaria, Poland, Russia, Belarus, Kyrgyzstan, Tajikistan,  Turkmenistan, Thailand, Laos, Vietnam, Palau, Tonga, Vanuatu, Maldives, Bhutan, Myanmar
All five WBG organizations: the rest of the 138 WBG members

Non-members are Andorra, Cuba, Liechtenstein, Monaco, Palestine, the Holy See (Vatican City), Taiwan, and North Korea.

The Republic of China joined the World Bank on December 27, 1945. After the Chinese Civil War, the government fled to Taiwan and continued its membership in the WBG until April 16, 1980, when the People's Republic of China replaced the ROC. Since then, it uses the name "Taiwan, China".

Excluded from the list are the following de facto states: Abkhazia, Artsakh, the Donetsk People's Republic, the Luhansk People's Republic, Northern Cyprus, the Sahrawi Arab Democratic Republic, Somaliland, South Ossetia, and Transnistria.

Organizational structure

Together with four affiliated agencies created between 1957 and 1988, the IBRD is part of the World Bank Group. The Group's headquarters are in Washington, D.C. It is an international organization owned by member governments; although it makes profits, they are used to support continued efforts in poverty reduction.

Technically the World Bank is part of the United Nations system, but its governance structure is different: each institution in the World Bank Group is owned by its member governments, which subscribe to its basic share capital, with votes proportional to shareholding. Membership gives certain voting rights that are the same for all countries but there are also additional votes that depend on financial contributions to the organization. The President of the World Bank is nominated by the President of the United States and elected by the Bank's Board of Governors. As of 15 November 2009, the United States held 16.4% of total votes, Japan 7.9%, Germany 4.5%, the United Kingdom 4.3%, and France 4.3%. As changes to the Bank's Charter require an 85% supermajority, the U.S. can block any major change in the Bank's governing structure. Because the U.S. exerts formal and informal influence over the Bank as a result of its vote share, control over the Presidency, and the Bank's headquarters location in Washington, D.C., friends and allies of the U.S. receive more projects with more lenient terms.

World Bank Group agencies
The World Bank Group consists of
 the International Bank for Reconstruction and Development (IBRD), established in 1944, which provides debt financing based on sovereign guarantees;
 the International Finance Corporation (IFC), established in 1956, which provides various forms of financing without sovereign guarantees, primarily to the private sector;
 the International Development Association (IDA), established in 1960, which provides concessional financing (interest-free loans or grants), usually with sovereign guarantees;
 the International Centre for Settlement of Investment Disputes (ICSID), established in 1965, which works with governments to reduce investment risk;
 the Multilateral Investment Guarantee Agency (MIGA), established in 1988, which provides insurance against certain types of risk, including political risk, primarily to the private sector.

The term "World Bank" generally refers to just the IBRD and IDA, whereas the term "World Bank Group" or "WBG" is used to refer to all five institutions collectively.

The World Bank Institute is the capacity development branch of the World Bank, providing learning and other capacity-building programs to member countries.

The IBRD has 189 member governments, and the other institutions have between 153 and 184. The institutions of the World Bank Group are all run by a board of governors meeting once a year. Each member country appoints a governor, generally its Minister of Finance. Daily, the World Bank Group is run by a board of 25 executive directors to whom the governours have delegated certain powers. Each director represents either one country (for the largest countries), or a group of countries. Executive directors are appointed by their respective governments or the constituencies.

The agencies of the World Bank are each governed by their Articles of Agreement that serves as the legal and institutional foundation for all their work.

The activities of the IFC and MIGA include investment in the private sector and providing insurance, respectively.

Presidency
Traditionally, the Bank President has been a U.S. citizen nominated by the President of the United States, the bank's largest shareholder. The nominee is subject to confirmation by the executive directors, to serve a five-year, renewable term.

Current president
On 5 April 2019, David Malpass was selected as the 13th World Bank Group President; his term began on 9 April 2019.

Managing director
The managing director of The World Bank is responsible for organizational strategy; budget and strategic planning; information technology; shared services; Corporate Procurement; General Services and Corporate Security; the Sanctions System; and the Conflict Resolution and Internal Justice System. The present MD, Shaolin Yang, assumed the office after Sri Mulyani resigned to become finance minister of Indonesia. Managing Director and World Bank Group Chief Financial Officer is Anshula Kant since 7 october 2019.

Extractive Industries review
After longstanding criticisms from civil society of the Bank's involvement in the oil, gas, and mining sectors, the World Bank in July 2001 launched an independent review called the Extractive Industries Review (EIR—not to be confused with Environmental Impact Report). The review was headed by an "Eminent Person", Dr. Emil Salim (former Environment Minister of Indonesia). Salim held consultations with a wide range of stakeholders in 2002 and 2003. The EIR recommendations were published in January 2004 in a final report, "Striking a Better Balance". The report concluded that fossil fuel and mining projects do not alleviate poverty, and recommended that World Bank involvement with these sectors be phased out by 2008 to be replaced by investment in renewable energy and clean energy. The World Bank published its Management Response to the EIR in September 2004 after extensive discussions with the board of directors. The Management Response did not accept many of the EIR report's conclusions, but the EIR served to alter the World Bank's policies on oil, gas, and mining in important ways, as the World Bank documented in a recent follow-up report. One area of particular controversy concerned the rights of indigenous peoples. Critics point out that the Management Response weakened a key recommendation that indigenous peoples and affected communities should have to provide 'consent for projects to proceed; instead, there would be 'consultation'. Following the EIR process, the World Bank issued a revised Policy on Indigenous Peoples.

Criticism

The World Bank has long been criticized by a range of non-governmental organizations and academics, notably including its former Chief Economist Joseph Stiglitz, who is equally critical of the International Monetary Fund, the US Treasury Department, and the US and other developed country trade negotiators. Critics argue that the so-called free market reform policies—which the Bank advocates in many cases—in practice are often harmful to economic development if implemented badly, too quickly ("shock therapy"), in the wrong sequence, or in very weak, uncompetitive economies. World Bank loan agreements can also force procurements of goods and services at uncompetitive, non-free-market, prices. Other critical writers such as John Perkins, label the international financial institutions as 'illegal and illegitimate and a cog of coercive American diplomacy in carrying out financial terrorism.

In Masters of Illusion: The World Bank and the Poverty of Nations (1996), Catherine Caufield argues that the assumptions and structure of the World Bank operation ultimately harm developing nations rather than promote them. Caufield first criticizes the highly homogenized and Western recipes of "development" the Bank holds. To the World Bank, different nations and regions are indistinguishable and ready to receive the "uniform remedy of development". The danger of this assumption is that to attain even small portions of success, Western approaches to life are adopted and traditional economic structures and values are abandoned. A second assumption is that poor countries cannot modernize without money and advice from abroad.

Several intellectuals in developing countries have argued that the World Bank is deeply implicated in contemporary modes of donor and NGO-driven imperialism and that its intellectual contribution functions, primarily, to seek to blame the poor for their condition.

Defenders of the World Bank contend that no country is forced to borrow its money. The Bank provides both loans and grants. Even the loans are concessional since they are given to countries that have no access to international capital markets. Furthermore, the loans, both to poor and middle-income countries, are below market-value interest rates. The World Bank argues that it can help development more through loans than grants because money repaid on the loans can then be lent for other projects.

Criticism was also expressed towards the IFC and MIGA and their way of evaluating the social and environmental impact of their projects. Critics state that even though IFC and MIGA have more of these standards than the World Bank, they mostly rely on private-sector clients to monitor their implementation and miss an independent monitoring institution in this context. This is why an extensive review of the institutions' implementation strategy of social and environmental standards is demanded.

The World Bank was the subject of a scandal with its then-President Paul Wolfowitz and his aide, Shaha Riza, in 2007.

Allegations of corruption

The World Bank's Integrity Vice Presidency (INT) is charged with the investigation of internal fraud and corruption, including complaint intake, investigation, and investigation reports.

Investments
The World Bank Group has also been criticized for investing in projects with human rights issues.

The Compliance Advisor/Ombudsman (CAO) criticized a loan the Bank made to the palm oil company Dinant after the 2009 Honduran coup d'état. There have been numerous killings of Campesinos in the region where Dinant was operating.

Other controversial investments include loans to the Chixoy Hydroelectric Dam in Guatemala while it was under military dictatorship, and to Goldcorp (then Glamis Gold) for the construction of the Marlin Mine.

In 2019, the Congressional-Executive Commission on China questioned the World Bank about a loan in Xinjiang, China, that was used to buy high-end security gear, including surveillance equipment. The Bank launched an internal investigation in response to the allegation. In August 2020, U.S. lawmakers questioned the continued disbursement of the loan.

List of presidents

Eugene Meyer (18 June 1946 – 4 December 1946)
John J. McCloy (17 March 1947 – 1 July 1949)
Eugene R. Black, Sr. (1 July 1949 – 1 January 1963)
George D. Woods (1 January 1963 – 1 April 1968)
Robert McNamara (1 April 1968 – 1 July 1981)
Alden W. Clausen (1 July 1981 – 1 July 1986)
Barber Conable (1 July 1986 – 1 September 1991)
Lewis T. Preston (1 September  1991 – 1 February 1995)
Acting: Ernest Stern (1 February 1995 – 1 June 1995)
James Wolfensohn (1 June 1995 – 1 June 2005)
Paul Wolfowitz (1 June 2005 – 1 July 2007)
Robert Zoellick (1 July 2007 – 1 July 2012)
Jim Yong Kim (1 July 2012 – 1 February 2019)
Kristalina Georgieva (1 February 2019 – 4 April 2019) (Interim)
David Malpass (5 April 2019 – present)

List of chief economists

Hollis B. Chenery (1972–1982)
Anne Osborn Krueger (1982–1986)
Stanley Fischer (1988–1990)
Lawrence Summers (1991–1993)
Michael Bruno (1993–1996)
Joseph E. Stiglitz (1997–2000)
Nicholas Stern (2000–2003)
François Bourguignon (2003–2007)
Justin Yifu Lin (June 2008 – June 2012)
Martin Ravallion - (June 2012 – October 2012)
Kaushik Basu (October 2012 – July 2016)
Paul Romer (August 2016 – January 2018)
Shanta Devarajan (January 2018 – November 2018) (Acting)
Pinelopi Koujianou Goldberg (November 2018 – February 2020)
Aart Kraay (March 2020 – June 2020) (Acting)
Carmen Reinhart (June 2020 – present)

List of World Bank Directors-General of Evaluation

Christopher Willoughby, Successively Unit Chief, Division Chief, and Department Director for Operations Evaluation (1970–1976)
Mervyn L. Weiner, First Director-General, Operations Evaluation (1975–1984)
Yves Rovani, Director-General, Operations Evaluation (1986–1992)
Robert Picciotto, Director-General, Operations Evaluation (1992–2002)
Gregory K. Ingram, Director-General, Operations Evaluation (2002–2005)
Vinod Thomas, Director-General, Evaluation (2005–2011)
Caroline Heider, Director-General, Evaluation (2011–present)

See also

 Brazil and the World Bank
 China and the World Bank
 Honduras and the World Bank
 Zimbabwe and the World Bank
 Architecture of Washington, D.C.

References

External links

 

 
United Nations specialized agencies
International development organizations
Multilateral development banks
United Nations Development Group
United Nations Economic and Social Council
Banks established in 1945
Non-profit organizations based in Washington, D.C.
Organizations established in 1945